Garnik Mehrabian (September 1937 – 5 June 2022) was an Iranian Armenian football player and coach.

Managerial career
After retiring from professional football, Mehrabian received a coaching position from Iranian Armenian club Ararat Tehran F.C. His success at the club earned Mehrabian the opportunity to coach both the Iran U20 and Iran senior national teams.

Upon being released from his duties in 1978, Mehrabian began a short stint with Machine Sazi in Tabriz. This opportunity revitalized his coaching career, bringing him to the attention of the United Arab Emirates Football Association, becoming the coach of the nation's team in 1980.

Mehrabian later resided in Glendale, California, where he was the director of his own soccer academy and was the coach of amateur side Pyunik Los Angeles.

References

External sources
 Official Site

1937 births
2022 deaths
Iranian people of Armenian descent
Iranian emigrants to the United States
Sportspeople from Tehran
Ethnic Armenian sportspeople
Iranian footballers
Association football midfielders
Iran international footballers
Esteghlal F.C. players
Iranian expatriate football managers
Iranian expatriate sportspeople in the United Arab Emirates
Expatriate football managers in the United Arab Emirates